The Book of Love discography consists of four studio albums, three compilation album, fourteen singles, and one promo only single released on Sire Records, or Reprise Records, as well as nine music videos. The band has had their songs appear on more than forty compilations, as well as three music videos on three various video compilations.

Book of Love are an electronic music group formed in 1983, in Philadelphia, Pennsylvania and later based out of New York City. The group's line-up is Susan Ottaviano (lead vocals), Ted Ottaviano (keyboards, programming, vocals, chief songwriter), Jade Lee (keyboards, percussion, vocals) and Lauren Roselli (keyboards, vocals).

Since their debut in 1986, Book of Love have had their biggest success on the US dance charts, placing seven singles in the Billboard Hot Dance Club Play chart between 1985 and 1993. In February, 2001 — sixteen years after its first dance chart entry — Book of Love had its first number-one hit on the US dance chart when "Boy", a track originally from its debut album, was remixed and re-released as the lead single from their greatest hits collection, I Touch Roses: The Best of Book of Love. The group's largest exposure on pop radio was with the song "Pretty Boys And Pretty Girls", which became Book of Love's only Hot 100 entry, peaking at number 90 in 1988. The band have had two albums, Lullaby and Candy Carol, enter the Billboard 200, peaking at no. 156 and no. 174 respectively.

Albums

Studio albums

Compilation albums

Single releases

Singles

Promotional singles

Videography

Music videos

Music video appearances

Other appearances

See also 
List of artists who reached number one on the US Dance chart

References

External links
Book of Love Discography - Official Web Site
 Book of Love Discography on Discogs.com
 
 
 
 
 
 
 
 
 

Discographies of American artists
New wave discographies